Euaxoctopus is a genus of octopuses in the family Octopodidae.

Species
 Euaxoctopus panamensis Voss, 1971 
 Euaxoctopus pillsburyae Voss, 1975 – Map Octopus 
 Euaxoctopus scalenus * (Hoyle, 1904)

The species listed above with an asterisk (*) are questionable and need further study to determine if they are valid species or synonyms.

References

External links

 

Octopodidae
Cephalopod genera